The Road to Ruin is a 1792 comedy play by the British writer Thomas Holcroft.

It premiered at Covent Garden in London with a cast that featured William Thomas Lewis as Goldfinch, John Quick as Mr Silky, Joseph George Holman as Harry Dornton, Richard Wilson as Mr Sulky, Joseph Shepherd Munden as Mr Dornton, George Davies Harley as Mr Milford, James Thompson as Sheriff's Officer, William Macready as Hosier, Ann Brunton Merry as Sophia, Sarah Harlowe as Jenny and Isabella Mattocks as Mrs Warren.

References

Bibliography
 Nicoll, Allardyce. A History of English Drama 1660–1900: Volume III. Cambridge University Press, 2009.
 Hogan, C.B (ed.) The London Stage, 1660–1800: Volume V. Southern Illinois University Press, 1968.

1792 plays
Comedy plays
West End plays
Plays by Thomas Holcroft